Grafton railway station is a railway station on the North Coast line in South Grafton, Clarence Valley Council, New South Wales, Australia.  It serves the city of Grafton, opening on 12 October 1915 as South Grafton when the line opened from Glenreagh. It was renamed Grafton City on 1 October 1976 when the original Grafton station north of the Clarence River closed. Since 2005, it has again been known as Grafton Station.

The original building was replaced by a new building opened on 26 November 1993 by Division of Page member Ian Causley. Some of the older buildings on the site are listed on the New South Wales State Heritage Register.

Platforms & services
Grafton has one platform. Each day northbound XPT services operate to Casino and Brisbane, with two southbound services operating to Sydney. In addition the daily Grafton XPT terminates at the station, stabling opposite the station overnight.

NSW TrainLink also operate coach services from the station to Byron Bay and Moree.

To the north of the station lies the Sunshine Sugar factory.

Heritage listing 

Grafton Railway Station Group is of State historic significance as a former major railway administrative centre for the North Coast. The extant refreshment rooms is a unique structure on the NSW rail system built for the movement of troops during World War II and remains as an important reminder of the site's role in the Australian war effort and the role played by rail in moving troops around the country. The extant barracks building is representative of a series of similar barracks buildings constructed throughout the NSW railway system for train crews to rest between shifts. The office block demonstrates the former administrative role of the site. Overall, the significance of the railway precinct has been compromised by modern buildings, the demolition of the extensive locomotive servicing depot and all other original buildings.

The surviving refreshment rooms and railway barracks from the pre-1993 station were listed on the New South Wales State Heritage Register on 2 April 1999. These consist of:

A large covered open dining hall area book-ended by a weatherboard kitchen and storeroom. The kitchen is a simple gable roofed building clad in corrugated iron and featuring timber double-hung windows, small rear porch and a simple verandah supported by timber posts fronting on to the platform. The storeroom is located under the gable roof of the dining hall and clad in weatherboard.

Barracks ( 1943)

Single-storey brick building constructed as two separate wings with a hipped tiled roof, simple decorative brickwork banding. The barracks features a series of bedroom and bathroom facilities, with a secondary wing featuring a kitchen and dining area.

References

Attribution

External links

Grafton station details Transport for New South Wales

Easy Access railway stations in New South Wales
Grafton, New South Wales
Northern Rivers
Railway stations in Australia opened in 1915
Regional railway stations in New South Wales
New South Wales State Heritage Register
Articles incorporating text from the New South Wales State Heritage Register
North Coast railway line, New South Wales